PineBridge Investments (also known as PineBridge) is an American asset management firm. It was previously the asset management division of American International Group (AIG) known as AIG Investments before being sold to the Pacific Century Group in 2010. It was subsequently renamed to PineBridge Investments.

History 

The predecessor to PineBridge was originally formed in 1996 as AIG Investments, the asset management division of AIG to oversee the group's $75 billion assets. This was done by consolidating AIG’s various investment entities into a single platform and at the time of the entity's establishment, it had 300 employees. Win Neuger who joined AIG in 1995 to lead and grow the division, was the CEO of AIG Investments as well CIO of AIG.

In 2004, AIG Investments set up a joint venture with Huatai Securities forming AIG-Huatai Fund Management (now known as Huatai-PineBridge Fund Management).

By 2008, the size of AIG's investments had reached $712 billion.

Due to the Financial crisis of 2007–2008, AIG underwent significant financial difficulty and was close to bankruptcy resulting in the US government needing to spent $182 billion to bailouts. As a result AIG needed to sell off many of its assets to repay the government bailout. It has been speculated that Neuger was significantly responsible for AIG's near collapse due to allowing the group to take on excessive risk related to mortgage-backed securities in order to obtain higher profits.

In September 2009, Richard Li of the Hong Kong-based Pacific Century Group announced he would acquire AIG Investments from AIG for $500 million. On March 2010, the transaction was completed where Bridge Partners, a subsidiary of Pacific Century Group, acquired AIG Investments.  The firm now independent of AIG was renamed to PineBridge Investments. Neuger who resigned from his posts at AIG, become CEO of the newly established entity.

In 2012, only two years later, Neuger stepped down from his role of CEO at PineBridge.

In 2020, PineBridge acquired Benson Elliot Capital, a UK based private equity real estate firm. The new entity known as PineBridge Benson Elliot LLP then acquired housing developer, Sigma Capital Group in 2021.

References

External links 
Official website

American International Group
Companies established in 1996
Financial services companies established in 1996
Investment companies based in New York City
Investment companies of the United States
Investment management companies